Dicranophora is a genus of two mold species in the family Mucoraceae. It was circumscribed by German mycologist Joseph Schröter in 1886. The type species is Dicranophora fulva, a yellow mold that grows on the fruit bodies of bolete mushrooms.

References

External links

Zygomycota genera
Taxa named by Joseph Schröter
Taxa described in 1886